Pnirontis infirma is a species of assassin bug in the family Reduviidae. It is found in the Caribbean Sea, Central America, North America, and South America.

References

Further reading

 

Reduviidae
Articles created by Qbugbot
Insects described in 1859